is a dam in the Gifu Prefecture of Japan.

The gravity dam was completed in 1926 and is managed by Chubu Electric Power. The water intake of the "Kamiasō plant" is used to generate 27,000 kilowatts of electricity. 
and Japan water agency's "Kisogawa Yosui" abstracts water from here, which is used for irrigation and water supply in central Gifu prefecture.

Dams in Gifu Prefecture
Dams completed in 1926